Departmental is a 1980 Australian TV movie based on a play by Mervyn Rutherford. It was part of the ABC's Australian Theatre Festival. Reviews were poor.

Plot
The disappearance of money from a safe in a police station leads to an internal inquiry.

References

External links

Departmental at Screen Australia

1980 television films
1980 films
Australian drama television films
1980 drama films
Films directed by Keith Wilkes
1980s English-language films